Yakubu is an English transliteration of a West African name and is a cognate of Jacob and James. Notable people with the name include:
Given name
Yakubu (born 1982 as Yakubu Ayegbeni), Nigerian footballer
Yakubu (Gobir ruler), historical ruler of the Hausa city-state of Gobir
Yakubu II, most recent ruler of the Kingdom of Dagbon
Yakubu Abubakar Akilu (born 1989), Nigerian footballer
Yakubu Adamu (born 1981), Nigerian footballer
Yakubu Adesokan (born 1979), Nigerian powerlifter 
Yakubu Alfa (born 1990), Nigerian footballer
Yakubu Bako, Nigerian governor 
Yakubu Dogara (born 1967), Speaker of the Nigerian House of Representatives
Yakubu Gowon (born 1934), head of state of Nigeria
Yakubu Gowon Airport
Yakubu Gowon Stadium
Yakubu Itua (1941–2006), Nigerian jurist
Yakubu Tali, Ghanaian politician

Surname
Abubakari Yakubu (born 1981), Ghanaian footballer
Ahmadu Yakubu, Nigerian-born polo player
Andrew Yakubu (born 1955), Group Managing Director of the Nigerian National Petroleum Corporation
Balaraba Ramat Yakubu (born 1959), Nigerian author 
Bawa Andani Yakubu, traditional ruler of Gushegu and former Inspector General of Police of the Ghana Police Service
Garba Yakubu Lado, Nigerian businessman
Hawa Yakubu (1948–2007), Ghanaian politician
Ismail Yakubu (born 1985), English footballer
John Yakubu, Nigerian politician
Imoro Yakubu Kakpagu (born 1958), Ghanaian politician
Haruna Yakubu (born 1955), Ghanaian academic
Mahmood Yakubu, Nigerian academic
Malik Yakubu, Deputy Speaker of the Ghanaian parliament
Malik Al-Hassan Yakubu, member of the Pan-African Parliament from Ghana
Shaibu Yakubu (born 1986), Ghanaian footballer
Yusif Yakubu (born 1976), Ghanaian footballer